Robert Barry Cutler (August 11, 1810 – April 3, 1882) was a Canadian Liberal politician who represented the riding of Kent, New Brunswick, for one term from 1872 to 1874. He represented Kent in the Legislative Assembly of New Brunswick from 1850 to 1856.

Born in Westmorland, New Brunswick, the son of Eben Cutler, he was educated at Annapolis Grammar School. He married Henrietta F. Charters in 1831. In 1855, he was a commissioner to settle the Canada disputed territory fund. Cutler was an assistant paymaster for the Intercolonial Railway from 1867 to 1872. He was an unsuccessful candidate for the provincial assembly in 1865 and for the House of Commons in 1867 and 1878. He died in Cape Bald, New Brunswick at the age of 71.

Electoral record

References

1810 births
1882 deaths
Liberal Party of Canada MPs
Members of the House of Commons of Canada from New Brunswick
New Brunswick Liberal Association MLAs